David Richards (born 30 July 1999) is a Welsh rugby union player for Dragons in the United Rugby Championship. Richards' primary position is fullback.

Rugby Union career
Richards was named in the Dragons first team for the 2021–22 season, as was added to their European squad in January 2022. He made his debut for the Dragons in Round 5 of the 2021–22 EPCR Challenge Cup against .

He made his first start against Zebre in the United Rugby Championship on 29 October 2022, scoring two tries and being named Player of the Match.

References

1999 births
Living people
Dragons RFC players
Rugby union fullbacks
Rugby union players from Cwmbran
Welsh rugby union players